Spooky Two is the second studio album by the English rock band Spooky Tooth. It was originally released in March 1969, on the label Island Records (licensed to A&M in the United States).

Critical reception

Spooky Two received mixed reviews from contemporary critics, including Rolling Stone and The Village Voice. Robert Christgau wrote in the latter publication that, "at its best ('Waitin' for the Wind,' 'That Was Only Yesterday') this group is not significantly poorer than Blind Faith. At its worst ('Lost in My Dream,' 'I've Got Enough Heartaches') it is painfully overwrought."

Mike DeGagne of AllMusic was more positive in a retrospective review: "Spooky Two is this British blues-rock band's pièce de résistance. All eight of the tracks compound free-styled rock and loose-fitting guitar playing, resulting in some fantastic raw music … their smooth, relaxed tempos and riffs mirrored bands like Savoy Brown and, at times, even the Yardbirds … Although Spooky Tooth lasted about seven years, their other albums never really contained the same passion or talented collaborating by each individual musician as Spooky Two."

In Canada the album reached #48 on the charts.

It was voted number 42 in the All-Time 50 Long Forgotten Gems from Colin Larkin's All Time Top 1000 Albums.

Track listing

Personnel

Spooky Tooth
 Mike Harrison – keyboards, vocals
 Luther Grosvenor – guitar
 Gary Wright – keyboards, vocals
 Greg Ridley – bass
 Mike Kellie – drums

Other credits
 Jimmy Miller – producer
 Andy Johns – engineer

References 

1969 albums
Spooky Tooth albums
Island Records albums
Albums produced by Jimmy Miller
A&M Records albums
Festival Records albums
Albums recorded at Morgan Sound Studios